Tarred and Feathered may refer to:
 Tarred and feathered
 Tarred and Feathered (song), a song by Dogs
 Tarred and Feathered (EP), an EP by The Hives
 "Tarred and Feathered", a song by Cardiacs on the 1987 mini-album Big Ship